Andrew Weekes (26 June 1940 – 21 January 2013) was a West Indian cricket umpire. He stood in four Test matches between 1983 and 1990 and three ODI games between 1983 and 1989. He was the first international cricket umpire from Saint Kitts.

See also
 List of Test cricket umpires
 List of One Day International cricket umpires

References

1940 births
2013 deaths
West Indian Test cricket umpires
West Indian One Day International cricket umpires